Blue is the fourth studio album by Canadian singer-songwriter Joni Mitchell, released on June 22, 1971, by Reprise Records. Written and produced entirely by Mitchell, it was recorded in 1971 at A&M Studios in Hollywood, California. Created just after her breakup with Graham Nash and during an intense relationship with James Taylor, Blue explores various facets of relationships from love on "A Case of You" to insecurity on "This Flight Tonight". The songs feature simple accompaniments on piano, guitar and Appalachian dulcimer. The album peaked at number 3 on the UK Albums Chart, number 9 on the Canadian RPM Albums Chart and number 15 on the Billboard 200.

Today, Blue is generally regarded by music critics as one of the greatest albums of all time; the cohesion of Mitchell's songwriting, compositions and voice are frequent areas of praise. In January 2000, The New York Times chose Blue as one of the 25 albums that represented "turning points and pinnacles in 20th-century popular music". In 2020, Blue was rated the third greatest album of all time in Rolling Stones list of the "500 Greatest Albums of All Time", the highest entry by a female artist. It was also voted number 24 in the third edition of Colin Larkin's All Time Top 1000 Albums (2000). In July 2017, Blue was chosen by NPR as the greatest album of all time made by a woman.

History
Despite the success of her first three albums and songs like "Woodstock", January 1970 saw Mitchell make a decision to break from performing. In early spring 1970, she set off on a vacation around Europe. While on the island of Crete and staying in Matala, she wrote some of the songs that appear on Blue. This journey was the backdrop for the songs "Carey" and "California"—"Carey" was inspired by her relationship with an American named Cary Raditz, who was the "redneck on a Grecian Isle" in "California". Some of the songs on Blue were inspired by Mitchell's 1968–1970 relationship with Graham Nash. Their relationship was already troubled when she left for Europe, and it was while she was on Formentera that she sent Nash the telegram that let him know that their relationship was over. The songs "My Old Man" and "River" are thought to be inspired by their relationship.

Another pivotal experience in Mitchell's life that drove the emergence of the album was her relationship with James Taylor. She had begun an intense relationship with Taylor by the summer of 1970, visiting him on the set of the movie Two-Lane Blacktop, the aura of which is referred to in "This Flight Tonight". The songs "Blue" and "All I Want" have specific references to her relationship with Taylor, such as a sweater that she knitted for him at the time and his heroin addiction. During the making of Blue in January 1971, they were still very much in love and involved. By March, Taylor's fame had exploded, causing friction. She was reportedly devastated when he broke off the relationship.

The album was almost released in a somewhat different form. In March 1971, completed masters for the album were ready for production. Originally, there were three old songs that had not found their way onto any of her previous albums. At the last minute, Mitchell decided to remove two of the three so that she could add the new songs "All I Want" and "The Last Time I Saw Richard". "Little Green", composed in 1967, was the only old song that remained. The two songs removed were:
 "Urge for Going" – her first song to achieve commercial success when recorded by country singer George Hamilton IV. It was later released as the B-side of "You Turn Me On, I'm a Radio" and again on her 1996 compilation album, Hits.
 "Hunter (The Good Samaritan)", which was released in 2021 on her EP Blue 50 (Demos & Outtakes).

In 1979 Mitchell reflected, "The Blue album, there's hardly a dishonest note in the vocals. At that period of my life, I had no personal defenses. I felt like a cellophane wrapper on a pack of cigarettes. I felt like I had absolutely no secrets from the world and I couldn't pretend in my life to be strong. Or to be happy. But the advantage of it in the music was that there were no defenses there either."

Mitchell continued to use alternate tunings on her guitar to allow easier access to augmented chords and notes in unexpected combinations. Due to the stark and bare revelations in the album, when it was first played for Kris Kristofferson he is reported to have commented, "Joni! Keep something to yourself!"

Critical reception and legacy

Today, Blue is generally regarded by music critics as one of the greatest albums of all time, with Mitchell's songwriting and compositions being frequent areas of praise. In January 2000, The New York Times chose Blue as one of the 25 albums that represented "turning points and pinnacles in 20th-century popular music".

Jason Ankeny of AllMusic describes Blue as "the quintessential confessional singer/songwriter album". Praising the songs as "raw nerves, tales of love and loss etched with stunning complexity", Ankeny concludes writing "Unrivaled in its intensity". The writers of Pitchfork gave the album a perfect 10-out-of-10 rating, calling it "possibly the most gutting break-up album ever made".

Blue was included in the 2018 edition of Robert Dimery's book 1001 Albums You Must Hear Before You Die. Based on Blues appearances in professional rankings and listings, the aggregate website Acclaimed Music lists it as 4th most acclaimed album of 1971, the 16th most acclaimed album of the 1970s and the 49th most acclaimed album in history.

Accolades

Commercial performance
The album was a commercial success. In Canada, the album peaked at number nine on the Canadian RPM Albums Chart. In the United Kingdom, the album peaked at number three on the UK Albums Chart and has been certified double platinum by the British Phonographic Industry (BPI) for sales over of 600,000 copies in the UK. In the US, the album peaked at number 15 on the Billboard 200 chart. The album was later certified platinum for sales over a million copies. The single "Carey" reached number 93 on the Billboard Hot 100 chart. In 2021, Blue peaked at number 1 on iTunes, 50 years to the day after its release. It also became the number 1 Audio CD on Amazon.

Track listing
All tracks are written by Joni Mitchell.

Side one
 "All I Want" – 3:34
 "My Old Man" – 3:34
 "Little Green" – 3:27
 "Carey" – 3:02
 "Blue" – 3:05

Side two
 "California" – 3:51
 "This Flight Tonight" – 2:51
 "River" – 4:04
 "A Case of You" – 4:22
 "The Last Time I Saw Richard" – 4:15

Personnel
According to the liner notes:

Joni Mitchell – production, Appalachian dulcimer, guitar, piano & vocals
Henry Lewy – engineer
Gary Burden – art direction
Tim Considine – cover photography

James Taylor – guitar ("All I Want", "California", "Carey", "A Case of You")
Russ Kunkel – drums ("Carey", "California", "A Case of You")
Stephen Stills – bass and guitar ("Carey")
Sneaky Pete Kleinow – pedal steel guitar ("California", "This Flight Tonight")

Charts

Certifications

References

External links
 

Joni Mitchell albums
1971 albums
Reprise Records albums
Albums produced by Joni Mitchell
Albums recorded at A&M Studios
Grammy Hall of Fame Award recipients
Folk albums by Canadian artists